Polynoncus bifurcatus is a species of hide beetle in the subfamily Omorginae found in Argentina, Bolivia, and Paraguay.

References

bifurcatus
Beetles described in 1962